Akqi County (also as Aheqi County) is a county in Xinjiang Uygur Autonomous Region, China. It is under the administration of the Kizilsu Kyrgyz Autonomous Prefecture. The county has a town and five townships, six communities and 25 villages under its jurisdiction in 2018, its county seat is Akqi Town. The county has a population of about 46,000 (as of 2018) with main ethnic groups of Kyrgyz, Han and Uyghur peoples.

The name of Akqi was from the Kyrgyz language, meaning  white achnatherum calamagrostis. The Administrative Division of Akqi was first established, it was named after its seat located in the Village of Akqi. The county of Akqi is located in alpine areas of the southern hinterland in Western Tianshan.

History
The county of Akqi was part of the territory of Weitou State, one of 36 States of the Western Regions, and part of Protectorate of the Western Regions (59 BC) in the Han period. It was part of Weitou Prefecture in Kucha Commandery in the Tang period, and part of Wushi County in the Qing period.

The Administrative Division of Akqi was first established from part of Wushi County in 1940, it was named after its seat located in the Village of Akqi in the present Karaqi Township. In 1941, its seat was moved to Uq, the present-day county seat of Akqi Town. The Administrative Division of Akqi was upgraded to be as a county in 1944. The county was under the administration of Aksu Prefecture in 1950, as a county, it was amalgamated to the newly formed Kyrgyz autonomous prefecture of Kizilsu in 1954.

Geography and Climate
The county of Akqi is high in the north and south, low in the middle, and tilted from west to east. Agricultural oasis is mainly concentrated in the valley area, the mountain natural pastoral land accounts for 86% of the county area. The Taushgan River originates from Kyrgyz Republic and has 19 tributaries with a total runoff of 2.421 billion cubic metres in the county, such as Uzuntux River.

Population and ethnic groups
As of 2015, There was  a population of 44,656 in Akqi County, accounting for  7.49% of Kizilsu Autonomous Prefecture's population. Of that, minority population of 40,121, accounting for  89.84%, and Han population of 4,535, accounting for 10.16%. The main minorities are Kyrgyz and Uyghur in the county. The Kyrgyz population was 38,765, accounting for 86.81%, and Uyghurs of 1,193, accounting for 2.67%. There were Hui people of 80, Kazakhs of 39 and others of 44.

Administrative divisions
The county was divided into a town and five townships, and six communities and 25 villages.
 Akqi Town, five communities and three villages.
 Kulansarak Township, five villages;
 Saparbay Township, three villages;
 Somtax Township, four villages;
 Karaqi Township, a community and three villages;
 Karabulak Township, seven villages.

Tourism
 Kyrgyz Non-material Cultural Town of Akqi County: Located in the western section of Jolangqi New Town, the Kyrgyz Non-material Cultural Town is a Kyrgyz folk culture village with an area of 1.5 sq kilomiters, it is a destination for Kyrgyz folk culture, consisting of Manas culture, falcon culture, nomadism, kumz string instrument, Kyrgyz felt show and embroider. It is seven kilometers away from the old town of Akqi.

References 

County-level divisions of Xinjiang
Kizilsu Kyrgyz Autonomous Prefecture